The canton of Causse et Vallées is an administrative division of the Lot department, southern France. It was created at the French canton reorganisation which came into effect in March 2015. Its seat is in Cajarc.

It consists of the following communes:
 
Berganty
Blars
Bouziès
Brengues
Cabrerets
Cadrieu
Cajarc
Calvignac
Caniac-du-Causse
Carayac
Cénevières
Cœur-de-Causse
Cras
Crégols
Esclauzels
Espagnac-Sainte-Eulalie
Espédaillac
Frontenac
Gréalou
Grèzes
Larnagol
Larroque-Toirac
Lauzès
Lentillac-du-Causse
Lunegarde
Marcilhac-sur-Célé
Montbrun
Nadillac
Orniac
Les Pechs-du-Vers
Puyjourdes
Quissac
Sabadel-Lauzès
Saint-Chels
Saint-Cirq-Lapopie
Saint Géry-Vers
Saint-Jean-de-Laur
Saint-Martin-Labouval
Saint-Pierre-Toirac
Saint-Sulpice
Sauliac-sur-Célé
Sénaillac-Lauzès
Soulomès
Tour-de-Faure

References

Cantons of Lot (department)